Mahbubul Alam (1 May 1898 – 7 August 1981) was a Bangladeshi writer. He won Bangla Academy Literary Award in 1965 and Ekushey Padak in 1978.

Early life
Alam was born in Fatehpur, Chittagong on 1 May 1898 to Moulavi Nasih Uddin and Azimunnessa Begum.  He was the second son. He secured a job with the Government Registration Department and served until retirement in 1955 as an inspector of registrations.

Career
In 1917, Alam joined the 49th Bengali Paltan of British Indian Army, He served in the Signal Corps and Mahbub spent about three years at different stations in Mesopotamia (present day Iraq) before being finally released in 1920, when the Paltan was broken up.

Works
In Bangla prose, Alam is a writer of fiction and historian. His literary works were included in the curriculum of school level, secondary, higher secondary and graduation level Bengali literature in Bangladesh.

Novels

Mofizon
Alam can be said to have written one novella, titled Mofizon, and one novel, Momener Jabanbondi Mofizon is on a theme of the suppressed libidinal instinct in human nature. This short fiction provides a bold treatment of feminine sexual arousal and suppression working simultaneously at a time when Bengali society was not ready for it. It was, therefore, criticised by the conservative section of the Muslim society, but Poet Sufia Kamal, a noted female contemporary writer of Mahbub's wrote very succinctly that everybody blamed "Mofizon"but nobody understood Mofizon's pains. The superstitious male attitude towards marriage and women is also criticised in this novella. 
Momener Jabanbandi
Mahbub's most well-known work, translated into English by Lila Roy as The Confession of a Believer is a novel—as the title suggests, on autobiographical elements—that portrays the central character as having gone through the continuous biting of the conscience mainly on moral grounds. As is Mahbub's habit to approach critical issues, the beginning of the novel contains a fictional discourse run by the child-protagonist about the existence of God. The later part of the novel shows the adult-protagonist as having overcome the temptation of seductive attractions from a married woman. This novel is rich in Mahbub's style of writing in bold, clear and precise sentences.

Short story collections
Tajia
A collection of short-stories, which mainly deals with religious bigotry, while Pancha Anna (meaning a co-mixture of themes), another volume, which has short stories dealing with supernaturalism, famine, domestic affairs and marriage. After his death, four volumes of humorous short stories were published, which are: Pradhan Otithi and Taza Singhi Macher Jhol (The chief guest and the gravy of the freshly cooked catfish), 
Rongberong (Varieties), Paltan, (Warfront), and Sat Satero (multiplicities).

Other works
Paltan Jiboner Smriti
It is the book with the publication of which in 1935 Mahbub arrived on the literary scene of the undivided Bengal. The book was first serialised in the monthly Mohammadi published from Kolkata, and it at once caught the attention of the readers for Mahbub's extraordinary verve in storytelling. Recollecting his days of war in Mesopotamia, Mahbub brings to life in bold humorous strokes his encounters with people in the kind of his Scottish boss, a lieutenant general, who presented him with a Robert Burns volume for his honesty, his co-mates and their pranks, cooks and guards of the camp, his sickness, the malaria epidemic in the quarters, and Iraqi date-tree gardens and their women. 
Gomf Sandesh 
It is a delightful reading, as all the stories in this book throw a mocking but serene blow at the complicated relationship between  Muslims and Hindus in the Bengal society. This book proves that Mahbub's major forte as writer lies in creating humour at the most unsuspecting moment.
Bangalir Muktijudhdher Itibritta 
It is a mammoth task drawing up a documentary history of the Liberation War that ended in the creation of Bangladesh. A 670-page long 4-volume history, this book, compiled over two years by an elderly Mahbub at the age of 73 to 75, is often considered as the first documented history on the subject. Mahbub visited hundreds of villages all over Bangladesh and interviewed several hundred people to collect information about the guerrilla warfare as well as the conventional war. 
Another book along this line, titled Bangaleer Samorik Oitijhya (The Military Tradition of the Bengalis), published recently contains unpublished writings of Mahbub as well as old entries from Paltan Jiboner Smriti..

Besides, under a UNESCO project, Mahbub produced a number of books describing the flora and fauna of the then East Pakistan (present day Bangladesh) and their habitat. These picturesque books on plants, birds and animals of Bangladesh are, unfortunately, not available now.

Personal life
While Alam was studying at Chittagong College, he married his distant relative Julekha. She died leaving seven children behind (three of whom died as infants), and Alam then married Rahela Khatoon, who gave birth to eleven children, and survived him by 26 years. On retirement, Mahbub took interest in social welfare and published a weekly newspaper, titled Zamana (meaning the current days), which he later on converted into a daily. Mahbub died in his own house at Kazir Dewry, Chittagong on 7 August 1981. His American writer-friend Robert C. Hammock wrote a chapter on Mahbub in his book Below the Llano Estakado.

Award
 Adamjee Literary Award (1963)
 Bangla Academy Literary Award (1964)
 President's Pride of Performance (1965)
 Ekushey Padak (1978)

References

External links 

Golpo Songroho (Collected Stories), the national textbook of B.A. (pass and subsidiary) course of Bangladesh, published by University of Dhaka in 1979 (reprint in 1986).
Bangla Sahitya (Bengali Literature), the national textbook of intermediate (college) level of Bangladesh published in 1996 by all educational boards.

1898 births
1981 deaths
People from Hathazari Upazila
Bangladeshi male writers
Bengali writers
Bengali-language writers
Recipients of the Ekushey Padak
Recipients of the Adamjee Literary Award
Writers from Chittagong
People from Chittagong